Peter Moore (1955) is a British-American business executive. He is known for his former positions as senior VP of Global Sports Marketing at Reebok, president of Sega of America, and corporate vice-president of Microsoft's Interactive Entertainment Business division, overseeing the Xbox and Xbox 360 game consoles. From 2007 to 2011, he was head of Electronic Arts' EA Sports game division. In 2012, he was appointed COO of Electronic Arts. He resigned from EA in February 2017 to become CEO of Liverpool Football Club. It was announced in July 2020 that Moore would be leaving Liverpool at the end of August that year, having completed his three-year tenure with the club.

Life and career 
Moore was born in Liverpool, England. He holds a bachelor's degree from Keele University, England, and a master's degree from California State University, Long Beach. He worked for Patrick USA, the US subsidiary of a French sportswear company, and then at Reebok for almost a decade. He also was a physical education teacher in Llangollen, North Wales, for a number of years. Moore recently became a resident of Montecito, CA.

Sega 
After Reebok, Moore was hired by Bernie Stolar to work at Sega of America. Despite his son owning a Sega Saturn, Moore knew little about video games. However, Moore quickly rose to prominence at Sega, being a big figure in the company's North American operations during the Dreamcast era. On 11 August, Sega of America confirmed that Stolar had been fired, leaving Moore to direct the launch. Moore became the president and chief operating officer of Sega of America on 8 May 2000.

Moore has been proud of the success of the Dreamcast game console and the satisfaction that owners still express today; including fans of the Shenmue game franchise, which Moore describes as the most vocal fanbase during his career at Sega. Moore disclosed to GamingSteve.com that at a security checkpoint at Chicago O'Hare International Airport, a TSA security agent said "I don't need to see your passport. You're the asshole that gave away Shenmue to Xbox". Many blame Moore for using Sega as a career ladder while misusing Sega.

Moore is often mistakenly blamed for the discontinuation of the Dreamcast and Sega becoming platform agnostic. This is often attributed to the following which he said in an interview:

We had a tremendous 18 months. Dreamcast was on fire – we really thought that we could do it. But then we had a target from Japan that said we had to make x hundreds of millions of dollars by the holiday season and shift x millions of units of hardware, otherwise we just couldn't sustain the business. So on January 31st, 2001, we said Sega is leaving hardware. We were selling 50,000 units a day, then 60,000, then 100,000, but it was just not going to be enough to get the critical mass to take on the launch of PS2. Somehow I got to make that call, not the Japanese. I had to fire a lot of people; it was not a pleasant day.

During his stint at Sega, Moore also portrayed a zombie in the film adaptation of House of the Dead along with producer of the original game Rikiya Nakagawa. Both are credited at the end of the film under "Special Thanks".

Microsoft 
On 20 January 2003, Microsoft hired Moore to help the Xbox console to compete with Sony's PlayStation 2 and Nintendo's GameCube. At Microsoft, Moore gained notoriety for displaying tattoos of Halo 2 and Grand Theft Auto IV that he used when announcing the respective games (the former was used to announce Halo 2's release date of 9 November 2004, while the latter was used to announce Grand Theft Auto IV). Some sources claim that the Halo 2 tattoo was not permanent and others have reported that Moore still has it.

Moore also reportedly endorsed the Wii console as an alternative over the PlayStation 3, claiming that for the price of one PlayStation 3 (US$599 at the time), the consumer can buy both the Xbox 360 and Wii.

Electronic Arts 
On 17 July 2007, Electronic Arts announced that Peter Moore would be leaving Microsoft to head the sports division at Electronic Arts. Moore reportedly wanted to move back to the San Francisco Bay area to live with his family, which was possible with EA. His position as vice-president of Interactive Entertainment Business at Microsoft was filled by Don Mattrick (who later also left Microsoft to join Zynga as CEO).

Moore was parodied in an episode of South Park, Season 15's Crack Baby Athletic Association, focusing on the NCAA's relationship with Electronic Arts. On 4 August 2011, Moore was promoted from EA Sports President to the role of chief operating officer in a structure reshuffle.

In an interview with the game press on 20 June 2012, Moore predicted the radical shift of the gaming industry's business model towards free-to-play, saying he believed within 10 years the industry would shift to that model entirely. Under his leadership, games such as Star Wars: The Old Republic and Command & Conquer: Generals 2 changed focus from a single player campaign game into a free-to-play multiplayer game with microtransactions.

On 10 December 2015, Moore was appointed as the "Chief Competition Officer" of EA's newly formed competitive gaming division.

Liverpool FC 

Moore left EA and was announced as the new CEO of the Liverpool Football Club on 27 February 2017. Moore took up his new role, which comprises running the business of the club, on 1 June 2017 and reported directly to the club's owners, Fenway Sports Group.
Moore stepped down as CEO at the end of August 2020 with Billy Hogan stepping up from his role as the club's managing director and chief commercial officer. During his tenure with the club, they won the UEFA Champions League, the FIFA Club World Cup and the Premier League. Moore was also named Premier League CEO of the Year in 2019. Moore created and funded the Peter Moore Foundation while in Liverpool, supporting such causes and institutions as social isolation, food poverty, cancer research and Alder Hey Hospital and the new Clatterbridge Cancer Centre in Liverpool. He, with his wife Debbie, were named honorary Life Presidents of Fans Supporting Foodbanks, a volunteer organisation that collects food for those in need at football matches and various local events.

Gresford Athletic FC 
In August 2020, it was announced that Moore would become the Honorary President of Gresford Athletic Football Club. He previously played as a right back for the club during the 1960s and 1970s, in both the youth team and first team.

Wrexham AFC 
In November 2020, it was announced that Moore would be involved with Wrexham AFC as an advisor to the new owners, actors Ryan Reynolds and Rob McElhenney.

Unity Technologies 
In January 2021 Moore was named SVP and GM of Sports and Live Entertainment for Unity Technologies. Later in the year, he was named to the boards of Nifty Games and Motorsport Games.

References

External links

	

1955 births
Alumni of Keele University
British business executives
Businesspeople from Liverpool
California State University, Long Beach alumni
Chief operating officers
Corporate executives
Electronic Arts employees
Liverpool F.C. chairmen and investors
Living people
Microsoft employees
Sega people
Video game businesspeople